The Ostromir Gospels (Russian: Остромирово Евангелие) is the oldest dated East Slavic book.  (Archeologists have dated the Novgorod Codex, a wax writing tablet with excerpts from the Psalms, discovered in 2000, to an earlier time range, but unlike the Ostromir Gospels it does not contain an explicit date.).  The Ostromir Gospels was created by deacon Gregory for his patron, Posadnik Ostromir of Novgorod, in 1056 or 1057 (the year 6564, in his dating system), probably as a gift for a monastery.

The book 

The book is an illuminated manuscript Gospel Book lectionary containing only feast-day and Sunday readings. It is written in a large uncial hand in two columns on 294 parchment sheets of the size 20 x 24 cm.  Each page contains eighteen lines.  The book is concluded by the scribe's notice about the circumstances of its creation.  

Three full page evangelist portraits survive, by two different artists, and many pages have decorative elements.  The close resemblance between this and the equivalent pages in the Mstislav Lectionary suggests they are both based on a common prototype, now lost. The two artists who produced the evangelist portraits were both heavily influenced by Byzantine models, but the style of the portraits of Saints Mark and Luke seems to derive from Byzantine enamelled plaques rather than manuscripts.  

More early Russian manuscripts have survived from Novgorod, which was never occupied by the Mongols, than any other centre.

Later history
It is thought that the book was taken from one of Novgorod's monasteries to the personal collection of the Russian tsars in the Moscow Kremlin, where it was first registered in 1701. Peter the Great ordered it to be taken to St. Petersburg, where there was no mention of it until 1805, when it was discovered in the dressing room of the late Catherine the Great.

The Gospels were deposited in the Imperial Public Library in St Petersburg, where it remains. Alexander Vostokov was the first to study it in depth, demonstrating that the Church Slavonic of the manuscript reflects the Old East Slavic linguistic background of the scribe. The first facsimile edition was published under Vostokov's supervision in 1843. 

In 1932, the gem-studded book-cover induced a plumber to break into a case, remove and steal the binding, and hide the parchments behind a bookcase. Although the book was quickly recovered, no replacement binding has been provided to date.

See also
Codex Zographensis (late 10th century or early 11th century)
Novgorod Codex (first quarter of the 11th century) 
Svyatoslav's Miscellanies (1073, 1076)
Archangel Gospel (1092)
Mariinsky Gospel (11th century)
Mstislav Gospel (1117)
Yuriev Gospel (1119)
Halych Gospel (1144) 
Dobrila Gospel (1164)
Pantaleon Gospel (12th century)
Eusebius Gospel (1282)
Chelm Gospel (13th century)

References

Further reading
Evans, Helen C. & Wixom, William D., The glory of Byzantium: art and culture of the Middle Byzantine era, A.D. 843-1261, no. 198, 1997, The Metropolitan Museum of Art, New York, ; full text available online from The Metropolitan Museum of Art Libraries

External links

 Images from the Ostromir gospels
 Pages & description from the Russian National Library
 Ostromir Gospel at the National Library of Russia (2007)

1050s books
East Slavic manuscripts
History of Eastern Orthodoxy in Russia
Gospel Books
Memory of the World Register
Novgorod Republic
Cultural history of Russia
Ukrainian culture
National Library of Russia collection
11th-century biblical manuscripts
11th-century illuminated manuscripts
Church Slavonic manuscripts
Cyrillic manuscripts
Cyrillo-Methodian studies
Church Slavonic literature